Pomryaskino is a rural locality (a selo) in Aygulevsky Selsoviet, Sterlitamaksky District, Bashkortostan, Russia. The population was 295 as of 2010. There are 2 streets.

Geography 
Pomryaskino is located 19 km southwest of Sterlitamak (the district's administrative centre) by road. Aygulevo is the nearest rural locality.

References 

Rural localities in Sterlitamaksky District